Krzysztof Palczewski (born 1957) is a Polish-American biochemist working at the University of California, Irvine.

He is a Member of the National Academy of Sciences and the National Academy of Medicine.

In 2012 he was awarded Prize of the Foundation for Polish Science, the most prestigious scientific award for Polish scientists, for characterizing crystal structures of native and activated G protein-coupled receptor, rhodopsin, involved in eyesight.

His MS and PhD, are from the University of Wroclaw and Technical University of Wroclaw, respectively (Poland).  His early posts were at the University of Florida and the Oregon Health Sciences University. Dr. Palczewski completed much of his pivotal research at the University of Washington. In 2005 he moved to become the Chair and John H. Hord professor of Pharmacology at Case Western Reserve University. In 2018 he joined University of California, Irvine, where he is a Distinguished Professor and is leading the Center for Translational Vision Research.

Research interests
Palczewski's research interest lie in mapping the Visual Transduction System.  His work with determining the crystal structure of rhodopsin has given new insight into the function of G protein receptors. Furthermore, his work on visual cycle has led to revolutionary advances in understanding hereditary blindness, leading to implementation of novel pharmacological treatments that can slow retinal degeneration in adults. His team's efforts indicate that repetitive 2-photon imaging of the human eye can safely reveal the visual system's sub-cellular architecture and that humans can detect infrared light due to simultaneous 2-photon absorption. Recently, Palczewski and co-workers applied a new generation of CRISPR technology, base editing as a treatment for inherited retinal diseases.

References

Notes

Bibliography
 Vertebrate Phototransduction and the Visual Cycle, Krzysztof Palczewski, Academic Press (2000),

External links
 Department of Pharmacology, Case Western Reserve University
 Case Western Reserve's new medical researchers pump millions into Northeast Ohio economy
 Interview with Dr. Palczewski

Living people
1957 births
Polish pharmacologists
Polish scientists
Members of the National Academy of Medicine